In mathematics and computer science, symbolic-numeric computation is the use of software that combines symbolic and numeric methods to solve problems.

Background

Computational Algebraic Geometry

References

External links
 
Professional organizations
 ACM SIGSAM: Special Interest Group in Symbolic and Algebraic Manipulation

Computer algebra
Numerical analysis
Computational science